Ameranna royalensis is a species of sea snail, a marine gastropod mollusk in the family Pisaniidae.

Description

Distribution

References

 Watters G.T. (2009). A revision of the western Atlantic Ocean genera Anna, Antillophos, Bailya, Caducifer, Monostiolum, and Parviphos, with description of a new genus, Diantiphos, and notes on Engina and Hesperisternia (Gastropoda: Buccinidae: Pisaniinae) and Cumia (Colubrariidae). The Nautilus 123(4): 225-275
 Landau B. & Vermeij G.J. (2012) Caenozoic Research 9(1)

External links

Pisaniidae
Gastropods described in 2009